Pervari District is a district of Siirt Province in Turkey which has the town of Pervari as its seat. The district had a population of 30,276 in 2021.

The district is fully Kurdish.

Settlements 
The district encompasses the seat of Pervari, belde of Beğendik, forty villages and twenty-ones hamlets.

Villages 

 Aşağıbalcılar
 Ayvalıbağ
 Belenoluk
 Bentköy
 Çatköy
 Çavuşlu
 Çobanören
 Çukurköy
 Doğanca
 Doğanköy
 Dolusalkım
 Düğüncüler
 Ekindüzü (Hertevin)
 Erkent
 Gökbudak
 Gökçekoru
 Gölgeli
 Güleçler
 Gümüşören
 Karasungur
 Karşıyaka
 Keskin
 Kışlacık
 Kocaçavuş
 Kovanağzı
 Köprüçay
 Medreseköy
 Narsuyu
 Ormandalı
 Palamutlu
 Sarıdam
 Sarıyaprak
 Söğütönü
 Taşdibek
 Tosuntarla
 Tuzcular
 Üçoyuk
 Yapraktepe
 Yeniaydın
 Yukarıbalcılar

References 

Districts of Siirt Province